AZS may refer to:
Samaná El Catey International Airport
Arizona Southern Railroad
Akademickiego Związku Sportowego, the Academic Sports Association in Poland